Ji Bu ( 200s BC) was a Chinese military general of the early Western Han dynasty. He was from Xiaxiang (下相; present-day Sucheng District, Suqian, Jiangsu). He previously served under Xiang Yu, a warlord who engaged Liu Bang (Emperor Gao), the founder of the Han dynasty, in a four-year-long power struggle historically known as the Chu–Han Contention (206–202 BC). After Xiang Yu's defeat and death, Ji Bu became a fugitive of the Han Empire and had a price placed on his head by Emperor Gaozu. However, the emperor eventually pardoned him after being persuaded by Xiahou Ying and recruited him to serve in the Han government as a "Palace Assistant". He was promoted to the position of "General of the Household" after Emperor Hui ascended the throne, and was appointed as the Administrator of Hedong Commandery during the reign of Emperor Wen.

Anecdote
The Chinese idiom yi nuo qian jin, which is used to describe a situation where a promise is kept, was derived from a saying about Ji Bu: "a hundred jin of gold is nothing compared to a promise from Ji Bu".

References

 Sima Qian. Records of the Grand Historian (Shi Ji) vol. 100.

Han dynasty generals from Jiangsu
Chu–Han contention people